is a retired Japanese judoka.

She won two Olympic silver medals in the half-heavyweight (-72 kg) division, in 1992 and 1996. She won the All-Japan judo championships six times (1987–1992).

References 
 Database Olympics

External links 
 Official website

1966 births
Living people
Japanese female judoka
Judoka at the 1992 Summer Olympics
Judoka at the 1996 Summer Olympics
Olympic judoka of Japan
Olympic silver medalists for Japan
People from Tokyo
University of Tsukuba alumni
Olympic medalists in judo
Asian Games medalists in judo
Judoka at the 1990 Asian Games
Judoka at the 1988 Summer Olympics
Medalists at the 1996 Summer Olympics
Medalists at the 1992 Summer Olympics
Asian Games gold medalists for Japan
Asian Games bronze medalists for Japan
Medalists at the 1990 Asian Games
20th-century Japanese women
21st-century Japanese women